Markham Village Town Hall, also called Old Town Hall, is a building at 96 Main Street North in Markham, Ontario, Canada, and was the home to Markham Town Council from 1882 until it moved to a location on Woodbine Avenue. It was built in 1882 by local builder John Wilson in an Italianate architecture style, with brick, from a local brickyard, laid by mason Joseph Sampson.

Besides council chambers the building was home to a local jail, and to Masonic and Oddfellow Lodges.

The building was sold in 1946, was a cinema until 1980 until it was reconstructed to its original facade and modified internal structure by Tony Baggio CPEng. , it housed business offices and was one of many historically preserved buildings on Main Street Markham. It was designated a heritage site under the Ontario Heritage Act on April 23, 1985. The designation lists the following the features (excerpted from reference):

two storey coral brick exterior
shed roof
entrance with semi-circular fanlight and voussoirs of yellow brick
yellow brick detailing in voussoirs and joining string courses
decorated cornice
heavy timber truss supporting second storey and roof
round headed windows 
reconstructed brick chimneys

See also
 Markham Civic Centre

References

City and town halls in Ontario
Buildings and structures in Markham, Ontario
Italianate architecture in Canada
Tourist attractions in Markham, Ontario
1882 establishments in Ontario